Petryayevo is a rural locality (a village) in Vorobyovskoye Rural Settlement, Sokolsky District, Vologda Oblast, Russia. The population was 33 as of 2002.

Geography 
Petryayevo is located 72 km northeast of Sokol (the district's administrative centre) by road. Bolshiye Ivanovskiye is the nearest rural locality.

References 

Rural localities in Sokolsky District, Vologda Oblast